The Citadel of Montreal was a former fortress used to defend the city. It was located at what is now rue Notre-Dame between rue Bonsecours and rue Berri.

Smaller than the one in Old Quebec, the Citadel was built by the French in 1690 replacing the 1658 redoubt at Pointe-à-Callière. It consisted of a barrack structure surrounded by wood stakes palisade and located on a hill along the city's fortification wall. A cannon battery added in 1723.

The fort was demolished by the British in 1821 to allow for the extension of Notre-Dame Street.

See also

Old Montreal

References
Rémillard, François, Old Montreal - A Walking Tour, Ministère des Affaires culturelles du Québec, 1992.
Albertine Ferland-Angers, La Citadelle de Montréal (1658-1820)

History of Montreal
Old Montreal
French forts in North America
Buildings and structures completed in 1690
Demolished buildings and structures in Montreal
Military forts in Quebec
1690 establishments in the French colonial empire